Michael Hendry (born 15 October 1979) is a professional golfer from New Zealand. Since 2013 he has played primarily on the Japan Golf Tour where he won the 2015 Token Homemate Cup. He has also won four times on the PGA Tour of Australasia.

Career
Hendry was born in Auckland, New Zealand. He turned professional in 2005.

Hendry plays on the PGA Tour of Australasia where has won the New Zealand PGA Championship twice and the New Zealand Open. In 2012, he finished second on the Order of Merit. In 2017, he became the first New Zealander since Mahal Pearce in 2003 to win the New Zealand Open when he defeated fellow kiwi Ben Campbell and Australian Brad Kennedy in a playoff at Millbrook Resort. Hendry has the most wins on the Charles Tour, with eight between 2009 and 2022.

Hendry won the 2010 Indonesia Open on the OneAsia Tour. He finished third on the Order of Merit in 2010 and sixth in 2011.

Since 2013 he has played primarily on the Japan Golf Tour. In April 2015, Hendry won for the first time on the tour, at the Token Homemate Cup with a one stroke victory. In both 2017 and 2018 he was runner-up in the Gateway to The Open Mizuno Open, earning him a place in that year's Open Championship. He missed the cut on both occasions.

Professional wins (15)

Japan Golf Tour wins (1)

PGA Tour of Australasia wins (4)

PGA Tour of Australasia playoff record (2–0)

OneAsia Tour wins (1)

Charles Tour wins (8)

Other wins (1)
2010 Fiji Open

Results in major championships

CUT = missed the half-way cut
"T" = tied

Results in World Golf Championships
Results not in chronological order before 2015.

"T" = tied

Team appearances
World Cup (representing New Zealand): 2011, 2013

References

External links

New Zealand male golfers
PGA Tour of Australasia golfers
Japan Golf Tour golfers
Golfers from Auckland
1979 births
Living people